Peter Irvine Redfern (born August 25, 1954) is a former Major League Baseball pitcher. He had a seven-season career in the majors, from  until , all with the Minnesota Twins.

Redfern was the Twins' first-round pick, and the first pick overall in the secondary phase of the 1976 draft. After pitching in just four games in the minor leagues with the Tacoma Twins, he made his major league debut on May 15 against the California Angels. Although he gave up four runs in five innings, he was the winning pitcher (beating Sid Monge) in a 15–5 Twins victory.

On April 6, 1982, Redfern was the starting pitcher in the first Twins game at the Hubert H. Humphrey Metrodome on Opening Day, facing the Seattle Mariners. He lost the game to Floyd Bannister. That season would be his last with the Twins, as he was released at the end on March 25, 1983. Shortly afterwards, Redfern came into dispute with Minnesota Twins over how much money he was owed. A  released player in 1983 would get $26,000 severance pay but Redfern and his lawyers said x-rays showed he had an elbow injury and therefore the Twins owed him $160,000. He signed with the Los Angeles Dodgers, but appeared in just six games for their top farm team, the Albuquerque Dukes that season.

In October 1983, Redfern was almost killed in a diving accident at Newport Beach, California, which left him paralyzed and ended his playing career. He uses a wheelchair but is able to walk short distances with a walker. His son, Chad, was a minor league pitcher.

References

External links

Major League Baseball pitchers
Minnesota Twins players
Tacoma Twins players
Toledo Mud Hens players
Albuquerque Dukes players
Baseball players from California
Sportspeople from Glendale, California
USC Trojans baseball players
People with tetraplegia
1954 births
Living people
Pan American Games medalists in baseball
Pan American Games silver medalists for the United States
Baseball players at the 1975 Pan American Games
Medalists at the 1975 Pan American Games
Alaska Goldpanners of Fairbanks players